Kyle Feldt (born 9 February 1992) is an Australian professional rugby league footballer who plays as a er for the North Queensland Cowboys in the NRL.

Feldt has played for the Prime Minister's XIII, and was a member of the Cowboys' 2015 NRL Grand Final and 2016 World Club Challenge winning sides.

Background
Feldt was born and raised in Townsville, Queensland, Australia and is of Norwegian descent.

He played his junior football for the Norths Thuringowa Devils and attended Ignatius Park College before being signed by the North Queensland Cowboys.

Playing career

Early career
In 2008, Feldt was selected for the Queensland under-16 team. In 2009, he played for the Townsville Stingers in the inaugural season of the Mal Meninga Cup. In 2010, Feldt was selected for the Queensland under-18 team.

From 2010 to 2012, Feldt played for North Queensland's under-20. On 30 August 2011, Feldt was named on the interchange bench in the 2011 NYC Team of the Year. He finished his NYC career as the competition's highest ever point scorer, with 570 points.

In the 2011 NYC Grand Final against the New Zealand Warriors, Feldt had the chance to win the premiership for the North Queensland, however he missed a simple conversion on the full-time siren, and the club lost the match in golden point extra time 31–30. On 16 October 2011, Feldt played for the Junior Kangaroos against the Junior Kiwis, playing on the wing in the 28-16 win at Hunter Stadium.

On 2 December 2011, Feldt extended his contract with North Queensland to the end of the 2014 season.

2013
In Round 21, Feldt made his NRL debut for the North Queensland Cowboys against the South Sydney Rabbitohs, on the wing in the 30-12 win at 1300SMILES Stadium. In round 22 against the Penrith Panthers, he scored his first NRL try in the 36-4 win at Penrith Stadium. After the round 23 match against the Gold Coast Titans, in which he scored two tries in the 22-10 win at 1300SMILES Stadium, Feldt injured his ankle at training, ending his debut season. Feldt finished his debut year in the NRL with three matches and three tries. He was awarded the North Queensland Rookie of the Year award.

2014
In February, Feldt played in North Queensland's successful 2014 Auckland Nines squad. He starred in the tournament, finishing as the highest try scorer, alongside Parramatta's Semi Radradra, with five tries, and was named Breakout Player of the Tournament. On 26 May, Feldt re-signed with North Queensland until the end of 2017. After the round 7 loss to the Manly-Warringah Sea Eagles, Feldt spent time in the Queensland Cup for the Northern Pride before earning an NRL recall in Round 24 to replace Matthew Wright, scoring two tries in the 22-10 win over South Sydney. Feldt finished off the season with 7 tries in 10 matches.

2015
In January 2015, Feldt was a member of the newly established QAS Emerging Maroons squad. He again played in the Auckland Nines. Feldt played in Round 2 and Round 3 before spending a big part of the season playing for the Townsville Blackhawks in the Queensland Cup. On 3 May, Feldt represented the Queensland Residents against the New South Wales Residents, playing at centre and scoring a try in the 36-32 win. Feldt returned to first grade in Round 24, scoring a hat-trick of tries in the match against the New Zealand Warriors at Mt Smart Stadium, which North Queensland won 50-16.

On 4 October, in North Queensland's Grand Final against the Brisbane Broncos, Feldt scored a try shortly after the full-time siren which levelled the scores and gave Johnathan Thurston a chance to win the match. Feldt scored in the corner after Thurston, pressured by Brisbane front rowers Adam Blair and Sam Thaiday, was forced to pass to Michael Morgan, who made a break down the right edge and flick passed to Feldt after drawing a defender. Thurston missed the subsequent kick after it hit the upright. Feldt then produced a kick off that forced a mistake from Brisbane halfback Ben Hunt which gave North Queensland the field position required for Thurston to kick the winning field goal to win the match 17-16. Feldt finished off his premiership winning 2015 NRL season having played in nine matches, scoring eight tries and kicking one goal.

2016
Feldt played in North Queensland's 2016 NRL Auckland Nines squad. On 21 February, he was a member of the Cowboys' 2016 World Club Challenge winning side, starting on the wing in the side's 38-4 victory over Leeds at Headingley Stadium. On 5 May, Feldt was named on the wing in QRL journalist Tony Webeck's Queensland Residents team of the past ten years. After showing good form in the early rounds, Feldt was in contention for the Queensland State of Origin squad but unfortunately after error riddled performances against the Brisbane Broncos and the St. George Illawarra Dragons, Feldt missed out on a wing spot to Corey Oates. He finished the season as the Cowboys' top try scorer, with 15 tries in 24 matches.

2017
In January, Feldt was a member of the QAS Emerging Origin squad, and played in the Auckland Nines for the 4th consecutive year. In round 4, he played his 50th NRL game. Soon after, he re-signed with North Queensland until the end of the 2020 season. In Round 16 against the Penrith Panthers, Feldt scored the try of the year by leaping in the air to catch a cross field kick from Michael Morgan, towering over Penrith winger Josh Mansour to score in the corner and tie the match at 12-12 all with a conversion to come in the 78th minute. North Queensland backup goal kicker Ethan Lowe nailed the kick from the sideline to win the match 14-12. North Queensland had a finals winning run into the 2017 NRL Grand Final. Feldt started on the wing in the Grand Final against the Melbourne Storm in which they lost convincingly 34-6. For the second straight season, Feldt finished the season as North Queensland's top try scorer with 15 tries in 28 matches.

2018
On 23 January 2018, Feldt starred in the testimonial match for Johnathan Thurston and Cameron Smith, as North Queensland played their last year grand final opponents the Melbourne Storm. He scored a hat-trick of tries, the third try coming from a Johnathan Thurston banana kick on the 5th tackle with 18 seconds to go, to steal a 16-14 victory. In June, in the lead up to Game 2 of the 2018 State of Origin series, Feldt was selected as 19th man for Queensland as cover for the backline. In Round 24, he scored his second NRL hat-trick in a 44-6 win over Parramatta.

He finished as the club's top try scorer for the third straight season, with 14 tries from 24 games. On 13 September, he was awarded the Coach's Award at the club's presentation ball.

2019
In the 2019 pre-season, Feldt suffered a serious groin injury, which ruled him out for the first eight weeks of the NRL season. He made his return in North Queensland's Round 9 loss to the South Sydney Rabbitohs. A week later, he played his 100th NRL game in North Queensland's 17–10 win over the Parramatta Eels. Feldt played in all 16 of North Queensland's remaining games following his return from injury, scoring 11 tries and finishing as the club's top try scorer for the fourth consecutive season.

On 11 October, Feldt started on the wing and scored two tries in the Prime Minister's XIII's 52–10 win over the Fiji Prime Minister's XIII side. On 19 October, Feldt was a member of Australia's 2019 Rugby League World Cup 9s winning squad. He scored four tries in the tournament, including one in Australia's 24–10 final win over New Zealand.

2020
In February, Feldt was a member of North Queensland's 2020 NRL Nines winning squad. He and teammate Jason Taumalolo became the first players to win two NRL Nines championships. On 3 June, he re-signed with the Cowboys until the end of the 2024 season.

Feldt played all 20 games for the North Queensland outfit in 2020, finishing as the club's top try scorer (19) and point scorer (122). For the fifth straight season, he scored more than 10 tries. In Round 20, he scored his third career hat trick in a 32–16 win over the Brisbane Broncos, Feldt was set to be the Top Try scorer in the NRL for 2020 till the next day when Alex Johnston scored five tries for South Sydney Rabbitohs in their 60-8 thrashing of the Sydney Roosters. On 3 October, he won the North Queensland Member's Player of the Year award for the second time.

2021
Feldt played 20 games for North Queensland in the 2021 NRL season and finished as the club's top try scorer with twelve tries.  It was a disappointing season for North Queensland as they finished second last on the table.

2022
In round 8 of the 2022 NRL season, Feldt scored a hat-trick in North Queensland's 35-4 victory over Parramatta.
In round 11, Feldt was taken from the field during North Queensland's victory against Melbourne after being hit in a cannonball tackle by Brandon Smith.  Feldt was later ruled from playing for an indefinite period with a knee injury.
Feldt played a total of 20 games for North Queensland in 2022 and scored eleven tries as the club finished third on the table after the regular season concluded.  Feldt played in both finals matches which included the clubs upset preliminary final loss to Parramatta which denied North Queensland a Grand Final spot.

Achievements and accolades

Individual
Dally M Try of the Year: 2017
North Queensland Cowboys Coach's Award: 2018
North Queensland Cowboys Member's Player of the Year: 2018, 2020
North Queensland Cowboys Rookie of the Year: 2013
NYC Team of the Year: 2011

Team
2014 NRL Auckland Nines: North Queensland Cowboys – Winners
2015 NRL Grand Final: North Queensland Cowboys – Winners
2016 World Club Challenge: North Queensland Cowboys – Winners
2019 Rugby League World Cup 9s: Australia – Winners
2020 NRL Nines: North Queensland Cowboys – Winners

Statistics

NRL
 Statistics are correct to the end of the 2022 season

References

External links
North Queensland Cowboys profile
NRL profile

1992 births
Living people
Australian people of German descent
Australian rugby league players
North Queensland Cowboys players
Queensland Rugby League State of Origin players
Junior Kangaroos players
Northern Pride RLFC players
Townsville Blackhawks players
Rugby league centres
Rugby league wingers
Rugby league players from Townsville